Julen Jiménez (born August 4, 1994, Amorebieta-Etxano, Spain) is a Spanish film, theater and television actor and dancer.

Life and career 

He was born in the Biscayan municipality of Amorebieta-Echano in 1994. He studied, trained and graduated in theatre, drama and acting (BA) in Ánima Eskola School of Drama (2012–2016), training with David Valdelvira, Marina Shimanskaya and Algis Arlauskas, training as a method actor, under the Stanislavsky-M.Chekhov-Grotowski-Vakhtangov methodology (Russian method), following the methodologies of the Russian classical school. He also trained in music and music theory with Roberto Bienzobas and in dance with Rakel Rodríguez. He also studied voice and oratory training with Alejandra Nóvoa.

In addition, he trained in the Grotowski technique with the Polish actor Jaroslaw Bielski and in theatrical laboratory with Richard Sahagún. He also graduated in film directing at the Basque Country Film School (2013–2015). Currently he is an actor and a dancer.

In 2016, he starred in the short film El Puente with Carmen Climent. In 2019, he played Nancho Lopidana in the film Twin Murders: The Silence of the White City, directed by Daniel Calparsoro.

In 2016 he participated in the theatrical production Cálidos y fridos, a stage production at the Campos Elíseos Theatre, based on the works by Anton Chekhov and directed by the Stage Director David Valdelvira, which was presented in the week of the FETABI international festival, the university theater festival that takes place annually in Bilbao (Spain).

Filmography

Television 

 2020, Altsasu, dir. Asier Urbieta
 2020, La línea invisible, dir. Mariano Barroso

Film 

 2018, Twin Murders: The Silence of the White City, dir. Daniel Calparsoro
 2016, Un último capricho, dir. Joseba Hernández
 2016, El puente, dir. Xabier Xalabardé
 2016, Cinco minutos y medio, dir. Pablo Alonso
 2015, Contacto desconocido, dir. Pablo Alonso
 2013, Below, dir. Maria Zabala

Stage 

 2017, Proceso a Jesús, dir. Algis Arlauskas
 2013–2017, Escrito en la piedra (by Claudel), dir. Algis Arlauskas
 2016, Carmen y Antonio, dir. Algis Arlauskas
 2016, Cálidos y fríos, dir. David Valdelvira
 2016, Blancanieves, dir. Galder Pérez
 2015, El primitivo auto sentimental (by Lorca), dir. Marina Shimanskaya
 2015, Relatos de Chejov (by Chekhov), dir. David Valdelvira
 2015, El guante, dir. David Valdelvira
 2014–2016, El pabellón del olvido (by Chekhov), dir. David Valdelvira

Dance 

 2016, Il Barbiere di Siviglia (Opera), dir. Emilio Sagi, coreogr. Nuria Castejón
 2016, Lucrezia Borgia (Opera), dir. Francesco Bellotto, coreogr. Martín Ruiz
 2012–2014, Bailando el silencio, dir. Rakel Rodríguez

Opera 

 2017, Andrea Chénier, dir. Alfonso Romero

References

External links 

 

1994 births
Living people
People from Bilbao
Ánima Eskola School of Drama alumni
21st-century Spanish actors
Spanish film actors
Spanish television actors
Spanish stage actors